is a Japanese UCI Continental cycling team established in 2009. It traces its history back to 1973.

Team roster

Major wins
2009
Stage 4 Tour de Taiwan, Shinri Suzuki
Stage 6 Tour de Hokkaido, Shinri Suzuki
2010
Stage 4 Tour of Japan, Shinri Suzuki
2011
Stage 1 Tour de Hokkaido, Hayato Yoshida
Taiwan Cup, Kazuki Aoyanagi
Stage 2 Tour de Okinawa, Yusuke Hatanaka
2013
Stage 7 Tour de Taiwan, Hayato Yoshida
2014
 National Under-23 Cyclo-Cross Championships, Kota Yokoyama
2017
Stage 1 Tour de Kumano, Shōtarō Iribe
2018
Stage 2 The Princess Maha Chackri Sirindhorn's Cup "Tour of Thailand", Shotaro Iribe
Stage 2 Tour de Kumano, Shotaro Iribe
2019
Road Race, National Road Championships, Shōtarō Iribe

References

External links

UCI Continental Teams (Asia)
Cycling teams established in 2009
Cycling teams based in Japan